1120 Cannonia, provisional designation , is a stony Florian asteroid from the inner regions of the asteroid belt, approximately 10 kilometers in diameter. Discovered by Pelageya Shajn at Simeiz in 1928, it was named after American astronomer Annie Jump Cannon.

Discovery 

Cannonia was discovered on 11 September 1928, by Russian astronomer Pelageya Shajn at the Simeiz Observatory on the Crimean peninsula. Two days later, it was independently discovered by Grigory Neujmin (also at Simeiz), and ten days later by Eugène Delporte at Uccle Observatory in Belgium. The independent discoveries, however, are not officially acknowledged by the Minor Planet Center.

Orbit and classification 

Cannonia is a member of the Flora family, a giant asteroid family and the largest family of stony asteroids in the main-belt. It orbits the Sun in the inner main-belt at a distance of 1.9–2.6 AU once every 3 years and 4 months (1,205 days). Its orbit has an eccentricity of 0.16 and an inclination of 4° with respect to the ecliptic.

The body's observation arc begins unusually late at Uccle in January 1946, or nearly 18 years after its official discovery observation.

Physical characteristics 

Cannonia is an assumed stony S-type asteroid, according to its family membership.

Rotation period 

In November 2004, a rotational lightcurve of Cannonia was obtained from photometric observations by American astronomer John Menke at his Menke Observatory in Barnesville, Maryland. Lightcurve analysis gave a well-defined rotation period of 3.816 hours with a brightness amplitude of 0.16 magnitude. An anonymously submitted lightcurve gave a similar period of  hours.

Diameter and albedo 

According to the surveys carried out by the Japanese Akari satellite and the NEOWISE mission of NASA's Wide-field Infrared Survey Explorer, Cannonia measures between 8.1 and 10.8 kilometers in diameter and its surface has an albedo between 0.129 and 0.49.

The Collaborative Asteroid Lightcurve Link assumes a standard albedo of 0.24 – derived from 8 Flora, the largest member and namesake of the Flora family – and calculates a diameter of 10.8 kilometers with an absolute magnitude of 12.0.

Naming 

This minor planet was named after American astronomer Annie Jump Cannon (1863–1941), who developed a taxonomic system of stellar spectral types at Harvard University, and subsequently classified about 225,000 stars with these types for the Henry Draper Catalog. The official naming citation was mentioned in The Names of the Minor Planets by Paul Herget in 1955. She is also honored by the lunar crater Cannon.

Notes

References

External links 
 Asteroid Lightcurve Database (LCDB), query form (info )
 Dictionary of Minor Planet Names, Google books
 Asteroids and comets rotation curves, CdR – Observatoire de Genève, Raoul Behrend
 Discovery Circumstances: Numbered Minor Planets (1)-(5000) – Minor Planet Center
 
 

001120
Discoveries by Pelageya Shajn
Named minor planets
19280911